Perambalur division is the only revenue division in the Perambalur district of Tamil Nadu, India.

References 
 

Revenue blocks of Perambalur district